Nick Pope may refer to:
Nicholas Pope (artist) (born 1949), British/Australian artist
Nick Pope (footballer) (born 1992), English footballer
Nick Pope (journalist) (born 1965), British journalist
Nick Pope (British Army officer) (born 1962), British Army officer

See also
 Pope Nicholas (disambiguation)
Nick Cope, children's musician